Ibrahim Mahama (born 29 January 1971) is a Ghanaian businessman, and the founder of Engineers and Planners, the largest indigenous-owned mining company in West Africa, and the owner of several other businesses in Ghana including Dzata Cement Limited. He is the younger brother of John Dramani Mahama, President of Ghana from 2012 to 2017.

Early life
He was born in Piase in the Northern Region of Ghana to Emmanuel Adama Mahama, the first Minister of State of the Northern Region under the first President of Ghana, Dr. Kwame Nkrumah. His mother, Joyce Tamakloe comes from Keta in the Volta Region of Ghana.

He moved to the United Kingdom, where he studied at the College of North London. After college, he went on to live in London, where he worked for a property development company.

Career 
Mahama started his company Engineers & Planners in 1997 after his return from London. The company now employs over 3000 Ghanaian employees.

Mahama has also invested in Asutsuare Poultry Farms, which was started in 2004 and produces 150,000 eggs and 10,000 live broilers a day.

Mahama is also an investor and owner at Dzata Cement Limited, a fully Ghanaian-owned cement processing factory located in Tema. Construction of the factory began in 2011, and it is set to start operations by first quarter of 2018, projected to create 1,200 direct jobs. Its production capacity is projected to be 2 million tonnes of cement a year.

Philanthropy

Northern Ghana 
Mahama has been recognized in supporting the Northern and Zongo communities. Ghana has about 400 Zongo communities which have been described by many as deprived communities. He has catered for many in these communities, providing for education, healthcare, employment as well as funding projects within the communities.

He is currently in the process of building a 550-bed dormitory for his former high school, Tamale Secondary School in the Northern Region of Ghana, after a fire destroyed an existing dormitory.

Joyce Tamakloe Cancer Foundation
Following the loss of his mother to breast cancer, he has championed charity causes that create awareness on different types of cancer. He is a co-founder of the Joyce Tamakloe Cancer Foundation which has raised funds for several hospitals in Ghana as a contribution to the fight against cancer. The Foundation has provided free mammograms for over 1000 women across Ghana. The foundation played a key role in ensuring breast cancer patients received treatment under the National Health Insurance in Ghana. After the death of his mother,in 2005 the Joyce Tamakloe Memorial Cancer Foundation Polo Championship was set up in memorial of her who was a staunch member of the Accra Polo Club.

The championship is also used a way of creating awareness of cancers, for instance in 2009 when it was played to raise awareness on the dangers of prostrate cancer which is fast spreading on the continent of Africa.

Personal life
He is married to Oona Mahama and they have three children. He is the younger brother of John Dramani Mahama, President of Ghana from 2012 to 2017. His step-mother died in July 2016  He uses a Bombardier 604 luxury private jet named Dzata and was the first individual to buy one in Ghana.

Honours 
Mahama received the 2018 African Achievers’ Award in London, for African Industrialist of the year 2018 - during  the 8th edition African Achievers awards that took place in the House of Commons in London. He was awarded the Ultimate Man of the Year at the 2022 Exclusive Men of the Year Africa Awards.

References 

1971 births
Living people
Ghanaian businesspeople
Ghanaian expatriates in the United Kingdom
Ghanaian philanthropists
People from Tamale, Ghana
Tamale Senior High School alumni
People named in the Paradise Papers